This is a list of games for the HP 3000 minicomputer, organized alphabetically by name.

 Alphawar
 Backgammon
 BioSin
 Blackjack
 Chess
 Chomp
 Colossal Cave Adventure
 Convert
 Dungeon
 Empire
 Hamurabi
 Lander
 Mystery Mansion
 Othello
 Sahara
 UBoat
 Warp

See also 

 Lists of video games

HP 3000 games
HP3000